Live From City Hall is the fourth release by singer-songwriter Brendan Croskerry and produced by Dave Newfeld (Broken Social Scene).

From 2013 to 2014, Brendan worked for Toronto Mayor Rob Ford as a special assistant and recorded a free E.P. titled Live from City Hall inspired by his time in the mayor's office. The promotional video for the EP included a behind-the-scenes look in the mayor's office moments after being stripped of power on November 18, 2013.

Track listing

References

2014 EPs
EPs by Canadian artists
Concept albums
Songs about politicians
Songs based on Canadian history
Works about Toronto
Rob Ford